Dulas may refer to:

Places
Dulas, Anglesey, Wales
Dulas Bay, nearby
Dulas, Herefordshire, England

Rivers
Afon Dulas, two rivers (North Dulas and South Dulas), tributaries of the Afon Dyfi in Mid Wales
Afon Dulas, Llanidloes, a headwater tributary of the River Severn, in Powys, Wales
Dulas, Irfon, a left-bank tributary of the Afon Irfon, in Powys, Wales
Dulas, Ithon, a minor right-bank tributary of the River Ithon, in Powys, Wales
River Dulas, a tributary of the River Teifi, in West Wales
 Afon Dulas, Llanddulas, North Wales

Other uses
Dulas of Cilicia, a Christian Saint during the Roman Empire

See also